Astelia banksii is an evergreen silver-green plant from the beaches of New Zealand. It likes it best in partial shade and in infertile and well-drained soil.

References

Asteliaceae
Endemic flora of New Zealand
Plants described in 1837